Aulis was a Greek port-town, located in ancient Boeotia in central Greece, at the Euripus Strait, opposite of the island of Euboea. Livy states that Aulis was distant  from Chalcis.  

Aulis never developed into a fully independent polis, but belonged to Thebes (378 BC) and Tanagra respectively.

According to legend (The Iliad) the Greek fleet gathered in Aulis to set off for Troy. However, the departure was prevented by Artemis, who stopped the wind to punish Agamemnon, who had killed a deer in a sacred grove and boasted he was the better hunter. The fleet was only able to sail off after Agamemnon had sacrificed his eldest daughter Iphigenia. Strabo says that the harbour of Aulis could only hold fifty ships, and that therefore the Greek fleet must have assembled in the large port in the neighbourhood, called Βαθὺς λιμὴν. Aulis appears to have stood upon a rocky height, since it is called by Homer Αὐλὶς πετρήεσσα, and by Strabo πετρῶδες χωρίον. 

In 396 BCE, Spartan king Agesilaus II, imitating Agamemnon, chose Aulis to sail to Asia with his army. On the eve of sailing Thebans intervened and drove Agesilaus out of Boeotia. This event has been seen as the origin of Agesilaus' personal hatred towards Thebes, which greatly influenced the relationship between Sparta and Thebes over the next 25 years until the decisive Battle of Leuctra.

In the time of Pausanias, it had only a few inhabitants, who were potters. Its temple of Artemis, which Agamemnon is said to have founded, was still standing when Pausanias visited the place. 

Its site is located at modern Mikro Vathy/Ag. Nikolaos.

See also 
  for Jovian asteroid 6090 Aulis

References

Populated places in ancient Boeotia
Former populated places in Greece
Locations in the Iliad